Dodi  may refer to:

People
 Douglas Moreira Fagundes, Brazilian football player known as Dodi
 Dody, a list of people with the given name Dodi, Dodie or Dody
 Luca Dodi (born 1987), Italian cyclist
 Washington Joseph (born 1950), Brazilian basketball player known as Dodi

Other
 Dodi Island, in Lake Volta, Ghana
 "Dođi" (song), a 2021 Slovenian pop song
 DoDI (US Department of Defense Instruction) - see (DoDI) 6130.03, 2018, section 5, 13f and 14m

See also
 Pacifier (teether, soother), also called a Dodie